Graphium leonidas, the veined swordtail, veined swallowtail or common graphium, is a species of butterfly in the family Papilionidae, found in Sub-Saharan Africa.

The wingspan is 75–80 mm in males and 75–85 mm in females. Has continuous broods, peaking from October to April.

The larvae feed on Popowia caffra, Annona, Monanthotaxis, Uvaria, Monanthotaxis caffra, Annona senegalensis, Landolphia ugandensis, L. buchannani, Annickia chlorantha, Friesodielsia obovata, Uvaria and Artabotrys species.

Subspecies
Graphium leonidas leonidas (Sub-Saharan Africa)
Graphium leonidas pelopidas (Oberthür, 1879) (Tanzania: islands of Unguja and Pemba)
Graphium leonidas santamarthae (Joicey & Talbot, 1927) (São Tomé and Príncipe: Principe)
Graphium leonidas thomasius (Le Cerf, 1924) (São Tomé and Príncipe: Sao Tome)
Graphium leonidas zanzibaricus Kielland, 1990 Tanzania

Taxonomy
It is the nominal member of the  leonidas-group of closely species (Graphium leonidas, Graphium levassori, Graphium cyrnus).

References

Carcasson, R.H. 1960 "The Swallowtail Butterflies of East Africa (Lepidoptera, Papilionidae)". Journal of the East Africa Natural History Society pdf Key to East Africa members of the species group, diagnostic and other notes and figures. (Permission to host granted by The East Africa Natural History Society

leonidas
Butterflies of Africa
Butterflies described in 1793